Symbols for Legacy Computing is a Unicode block containing graphic characters that were used for various home computers from the 1970s and 1980s and in Teletext broadcasting standards. It includes characters from the Amstrad CPC, MSX, Mattel Aquarius, RISC OS, MouseText, Atari ST, TRS-80 Color Computer, Oric, Texas Instruments TI-99/4A, TRS-80, Minitel, Teletext, ATASCII, PETSCII, ZX80, and ZX81 character sets, as well as semigraphics characters.

Block

The image below is provided as quick reference for these symbols on systems that are unable to display them directly:

History
The following Unicode-related documents record the purpose and process of defining specific characters in the Symbols for Legacy Computing block:

See also
 Supplemental Arrows-C Unicode block characters  and 
 Block Elements

References

Unicode blocks